Guillermo Rodríguez may refer to:

Guillermo Rodríguez (baseball), Venezuelan baseball catcher
Guillermo Rodríguez (footballer), Uruguayan footballer
Guillermo Rodríguez (athlete), Mexican Olympic sprinter
Guillermo Rodríguez (politician), also known as Guillermo Rodríguez Lara, Ecuadorian politician
Guillermo Rodríguez González, Spanish archer
Guillermo Rodriguez (comedian), Recurring cast member of Jimmy Kimmel Live!